Killarney, also known as Lower Killarney and Alabama Plantation House, is a historic mansion in Ferriday, Louisiana, U.S.. It was built in 1855, a decade prior to the American Civil War of 1861–1865.

The house has been listed on the National Register of Historic Places on February 18, 1999.

See also
National Register of Historic Places listings in Concordia Parish, Louisiana

References

Houses on the National Register of Historic Places in Louisiana
Greek Revival architecture in Louisiana
Houses completed in 1855
Buildings and structures in Concordia Parish, Louisiana